Dasht-e Barm Rural District is a rural district (dehestan) in Kuhmareh District, Kuhchenar County, Fars Province, Iran. At the 2006 census, its population was 6,690, in 1,474 families.  The rural district has 15 villages.

References 

Rural Districts of Fars Province
Kazerun County